Droupt-Saint-Basle  is a commune in the Aube department in north-central France.

Population

Sights and monuments
Château de Droupt-Saint-Basle, 16th century castle and château, added to the list of monuments historiques in 1987 and 1993.
 Church of Saint-Léonard-et-Saint-Basle de Droupt-Saint-Basle, originally 12th century, added to the list of monuments historiques in 1986
 Château du Ruez, 19th century mansion

See also
Communes of the Aube department

References

Communes of Aube
Aube communes articles needing translation from French Wikipedia